Below is a list of German language exonyms for settlements and other places in Estonia.

Complete list

See also
German exonyms
List of European exonyms
List of German exonyms for places in Latvia

References
KNAB, Place Names Database of EKI: Estonia

Geographic history of Estonia
German
Estonia
Baltic-German people
German